Ischnochiton luteoroseus is a minute species of chiton in the family Ischnochitonidae.

Distribution
This species is endemic to New Zealand.

References

 Powell A. W. B., New Zealand Mollusca, William Collins Publishers Ltd, Auckland, New Zealand 1979 
 Suter, H. (1907). Notes on New Zealand Polyplacophora, with descriptions of five new species. Proceedings of the Malacological Society of London 7: 293–298.
 Spencer, H.G., Marshall, B.A. & Willan, R.C. (2009). Checklist of New Zealand living Mollusca. Pp 196–219. in: Gordon, D.P. (ed.) New Zealand inventory of biodiversity. Volume one. Kingdom Animalia: Radiata, Lophotrochozoa, Deuterostomia. Canterbury University Press, Christchurch.

Ischnochitonidae
Chitons of New Zealand
Molluscs described in 1907